Heights is a hamlet in the Saddleworth parish of the Metropolitan Borough of Oldham, in Greater Manchester, England. It is directly north of Delph, and four miles northeast of Oldham.

Lying within the ancient county boundaries of the West Riding of Yorkshire, it consists of a former pub (the Royal Oak Heights) which closed in 2020, some residential property and St. Thomas Church. The church is no longer in regular use; burials still take place and the graveyard is maintained. The churchyard and graveyard were featured in the film The Parole Officer starring Steve Coogan.
Becket Whitehead, folksong collector ("A Beggin' I Will Go", "Gallant Poacher", "Four Loom Weaver", "Mowing Match", "Jim the Carter's Lad"), lived in Heights Lane Cottage  and was buried at St. Thomas Church 1966.

Villages in Greater Manchester
Geography of the Metropolitan Borough of Oldham
Saddleworth